Elst may refer to:

Elst, Belgium, a village in the province of East Flanders, Belgium
Elst, Gelderland, a city in the municipality of Overbetuwe, Netherlands
Elst, North Brabant, a village in the municipality of Maasdonk, Netherlands
Elst, Utrecht, a town in the municipality of Rhenen, Netherlands
Elista, capital city of the Republic of Kalmykia, Russia (Kalmyk: Элст, Elst)
, a Dutch coastal tanker
Eric Walter Elst (1936-2022), Belgian astronomer
Koenraad Elst (born 1959), Belgian writer and orientalist
Endolymphatic sac tumor, a benign neoplasm arising from the endolymphatic sac